The Antwerp Marathon is an annual AIMS-certified marathon hosted by Antwerp, Belgium, organised since 1980 and held in April (since 2007; before then in different months). At this event, the more popular Antwerp 10 Miles is organised after the marathon itself.

Track
The start of the 42.195km is at the Left River Bank (Linkeroever) of Antwerp. After a loop of 8 km the track goes via the Waaslandtunnel (1770 meter), under the Scheldt to the North of Antwerp. Past the antique area, the old law court, the Binnensingel, park Rivierenhof, Antwerp International Airport and the Scheldt the finish is located at the Grote Markt.

Distances
Apart from the marathon and the 10 miles race, also runs over five and one km are held at this event.

Size
Far more people participate in the Antwerp 10 Miles than in the marathon itself. In 2014, the 10 Miles counted 25,998 participants and the marathon 1989 runners.

Past winners

See also
 List of marathon races in Europe

References

List of winners

External links
 Official Website of the Antwerp 10 Miles & Marathon

Recurring sporting events established in 1980
1980 establishments in Belgium
Marathons in Belgium
Annual sporting events in Belgium
Spring (season) events in Belgium